soffice.exe, as the name of a process on a computer running Microsoft Windows, may refer to:

StarOffice, a proprietary office suite which was acquired by Oracle
OpenOffice.org, which is descended from StarOffice and is open source
LibreOffice, a fork of OpenOffice created in 2010